David Foster (26 March 1955 – 13 April 1998) was an Irish equestrian. He competed at the 1984 Summer Olympics, the 1988 Summer Olympics and the 1996 Summer Olympics.

Foster was killed in a riding accident in 1998. The David Foster Injured Riders Fund, whose sole purpose is to financially help injured riders, was formed the following year by his wife Sneezy.

References

External links
 

1955 births
1998 deaths
Irish male equestrians
Olympic equestrians of Ireland
Equestrians at the 1984 Summer Olympics
Equestrians at the 1988 Summer Olympics
Equestrians at the 1996 Summer Olympics
Sportspeople from County Meath